Route 348 is a provincial highway located in the Lanaudière and Mauricie regions of Quebec. It runs from the junction of Route 125 just west of Rawdon and ends at Route 138 in Louiseville. It overlaps Route 337 and Route 341 in Rawdon, Route 131 northwest of Saint-Félix-de-Valois, and Route 347 in Saint-Gabriel-de-Brandon.

Towns along Route 348

 Rawdon
 Saint-Ambroise-de-Kildare
 Sainte-Mélanie
 Saint-Félix-de-Valois
 Saint-Cléophas-de-Brandon
 Saint-Gabriel-de-Brandon
 Saint-Gabriel
 Saint-Didace
 Saint-Édouard-de-Maskinongé
 Sainte-Ursule
 Louiseville

Major intersections

See also
 List of Quebec provincial highways

References

External links 
 Transports Quebec Official Map 
 Route 348 on Google Maps

348
Louiseville
Roads in Lanaudière
Roads in Mauricie